The following is a list of attributed sigils or pentacles of demons. In demonology, sigils are pictorial signatures attributed to demons, angels, or other beings. In the ceremonial magic of the Middle Ages, sigils were used in the summoning of these beings and were the pictorial equivalent to their true name.

See also

List of demons in the Ars Goetia
List of occult symbols
List of theological demons

References

Demonology
Lists of symbols
Magic symbols